Perfect society may refer to : 

Societas Perfecta, the name given to one of several political philosophies of the Roman Catholic Church in the fields of ecclesiology and canon law.
Utopia, a name for an ideal community or society, taken from the title of a book written in 1516 by Sir Thomas More.